Martin Skans Westerstrand (born 6 December 1973) is a Swedish musician from Gothenburg. In 1995 he founded hard rock band LOK. He was the lead singer there until the band was dissolved in 2002. After that, he and LOK – bassist Daniel Cordero started the band Rallypack together with guitarist Max Flövik and drummer Ian-Paolo Lira. In 2006 they changed the band name to Lillasyster (Little Sister), and released their first album in 2007.

References 

Swedish male musicians
1973 births
Living people
Melodifestivalen contestants of 2022
Melodifestivalen contestants of 2021